"Black Horse and the Cherry Tree" is a song by Scottish singer-songwriter KT Tunstall from her 2004 debut album, Eye to the Telescope. It is one of many songs that reuses the famous Bo Diddley beat from the influential 1955 song of his own name. The track was released on 21 February 2005 as the lead single from the album, charting at  28 on the UK Singles Chart the same month. The following year, the single became a hit outside Europe, reaching No. 7 in Canada and No. 20 in the United States and New Zealand.

Song information
KT Tunstall said of the song:

Tunstall also said the song was inspired by one summer when she was travelling across Greece on a moped and saw a large black horse "going nuts" in an olive grove. She wrote the track years later after watching a concert by Son of Dave, which inspired her to write a bluesy song. The lyric "my heart stops dead" refers to a heart murmur she had as a baby. She said, "I got into this fantasy that my heart felt betrayed and had decided to stop working. The song is about having to dig incredibly deep to find out who you wanna be." 

The song is usually performed solo by Tunstall, the original artist, with the layered guitar and vocals constructed piece-by-piece by sampling the parts live, and using a loop pedal unit to create the backing track. A performance of the song on Later... with Jools Holland (recorded before the release of Eye to the Telescope) was an important break in Tunstall's career. The song won Tunstall an award for Best Single of 2005 in Q, and it received a 2007 Grammy Award nomination for "Best Female Pop Vocal Performance".

The album version was used as the opening theme song for the CBC Television drama Wild Roses. The song was later redone by Aly & AJ for Pepsi Smash, included on the Japanese only re-release of their second studio album Insomniatic. "Black Horse and the Cherry Tree" was also used in advertisements for The WB show Pepper Dennis and the 2006 US Open. The song's video ranked No. 19 on VH1's 40 Greatest Videos of 2006. During the programme's airing, Tunstall stated that the day of the video shoot was the only time she had ever worn red lipstick.

Chart performance
In the United Kingdom, the single peaked at No. 28 in its first week and dropped out of the top 75 in three weeks. In the United States, "Black Horse and the Cherry Tree" was initially in the bottom half of the US Billboard Hot 100 chart. Only after Katharine McPhee sang the song on American Idol (in the 5th season) as part of a Billboard charts-based song selection did the tune rise rapidly in popularity; it jumped 56 positions on the US Billboard Hot 100 chart, going from No. 79 to No. 23, and then moving to No. 20, becoming Tunstall's first single (and only, to date) to appear on that chart's Top 20. McPhee would go on to sing the song again in her final performance show on 23 May 2006, finishing second to Taylor Hicks.

Track listings
UK and European CD single
 "Black Horse & the Cherry Tree"
 "One Day" (live)

UK 7-inch single
A. "Black Horse & the Cherry Tree" – 2:51
B. "Barbie" – 2:23

Australian CD single
 "Black Horse & the Cherry Tree"
 "One Day" (live)
 "Barbie"
 "Black Horse & the Cherry Tree" (instrumental)

Credits and personnel
Credits are lifted from the Eye to the Telescope album booklet.

Studios
 Mixed at Metrophonic (London, England)
 Mastered at 360 Mastering (London, England)

Personnel

 KT Tunstall – writing, vocals, guitar, bass, percussion
 Luke Bullen – percussion
 Andy Green – production
 Steve Osborne – original vocal recording
 Ren Swan – mixing
 Bruno Ellingham – engineering
 Graham Deas – engineering assistance
 Dick Beetham – mastering

Charts

Weekly charts

Year-end charts

Certifications

Release history

References

2004 songs
2005 singles
Aly & AJ songs
KT Tunstall songs
Music videos directed by Sophie Muller
Relentless Records singles
Songs about horses
Songs about trees
Songs written by KT Tunstall
Television drama theme songs
Virgin Records singles